Hardhead is a species of duck.

Hardhead may also refer to:
 Hardhead (Transformers), two characters in the Transformers series
 Hard Head, a 1988 arcade game
 USS Hardhead (SS-365), a Balao-class submarine
 Mylopharodon conocephalus or hardhead, a cyprinid fish native to California
 Sciaenidae or hardheads, a family of fish
 Centaurea nigra or hardheads, a species of flowering plant in the daisy family
 Hardhead (coin), a 16th-century Scottish coin
 Hardhead catfish

People with the surname
John Hardhead, English MP

See also
 Stubborn (disambiguation)